The Canby Mountains are a mountain range in Klamath County, Oregon.

References 

Mountain ranges of Oregon
Landforms of Klamath County, Oregon